Leo Pellervo Pusa (born 23 March 1947) is a Finnish athlete. He competed in the men's javelin throw at the 1972 Summer Olympics, but failed to register a result as he fouled all his three throws.

His personal best throw was 82.48 metres (old javelin type), achieved in 1972. He never became Finnish champion, with Hannu Siitonen taking all the national titles while Pusa was in his prime.

References

External links
 

1947 births
Living people
Athletes (track and field) at the 1972 Summer Olympics
Finnish male javelin throwers
Olympic athletes of Finland
People from Sievi
Sportspeople from North Ostrobothnia
20th-century Finnish people